Lipoveni is a commune in Cimișlia District, Moldova. It is composed of a three villages: Lipoveni, Munteni and Schinoșica.

References

Communes of Cimișlia District